On 25 December 2013, three bombings occurred in two locations in Baghdad, Iraq. They targeted Christians, killing 38 people and wounding 70 others.

Bombings
Two bombs first exploded simultaneously in an outdoor market in the Christian section of Athorien in Baghdad. The market attack killed 11 people and wounded 14 others.

A few minutes later, about half a mile away, a car bomb went off near St. John's Roman Catholic Church in Baghdad's southern Dora neighborhood. According to officials, "The bomb detonated at the end of Christmas prayers as worshippers were leaving the church." This bombing killed 27 and wounded another 56.

In total, the bombings targeting the two Christian-populated sites killed 38 and wounded 70. No group claimed responsibility for the attacks.

Reaction
 The United States Embassy in Baghdad condemned the attacks in a statement: "The Christian community in Iraq has suffered deliberate and senseless targeting by terrorists for many years, as have many other innocent Iraqis. The United States abhors all such attacks and is committed to its partnership with the government of Iraq to combat the scourge of terrorism."

See also
2004 Iraq churches attacks
2008 attacks on Christians in Mosul
2010 Baghdad church attack

References

2010s in Baghdad
2013 in Iraq
2013 murders in Iraq
2013 Christmas Day bombings
21st-century mass murder in Iraq
Attacks on buildings and structures in 2013
2013 Christmas Day bombings 
Attacks on churches in Asia
Attacks on religious buildings and structures in Iraq
Bombings in the Iraqi insurgency
Car and truck bombings in Iraq
2013 Christmas Day bombings
December 2013 crimes in Asia
December 2013 events in Iraq
Improvised explosive device bombings in 2013
2013 Christmas Day
Marketplace attacks in Iraq
Mass murder in 2013
2013 Christmas Day bombings
Persecution of Christians in Iraq
Religiously motivated violence in Iraq
Terrorist incidents in Iraq in 2013
Building bombings in Iraq
Church bombings by Islamists